Antal Szerb (1 May 1901, Budapest – 27 January 1945, Balf) was a noted Hungarian scholar and writer. He is generally considered to be one of the major Hungarian writers of the 20th century.

Life and career
Szerb was born in 1901 to assimilated Jewish parents in Budapest, but baptized Catholic. He studied Hungarian, German and later English, obtaining a doctorate in 1924. From 1924 to 1929 he lived in France and Italy, also spending a year in London, England, from 1929 to 1930.

As a student, he published essays on Georg Trakl and Stefan George, and quickly established a formidable reputation as a scholar, writing erudite studies of William Blake and Henrik Ibsen among other works. Elected President of the Hungarian Literary Academy in 1933, aged just 32, he published his first novel, The Pendragon Legend (which draws upon his personal experience of living in Britain) the following year. His second and best-known work,  (Journey by Moonlight) came out in 1937. He was made a Professor of Literature at the University of Szeged the same year. He was twice awarded the Baumgarten Prize, in 1935 and 1937. Szerb also translated books from English, French, and Italian, including works by Anatole France, P. G. Wodehouse, and Hugh Walpole.

In 1941 he published a History of World Literature which continues to be authoritative today. He also published a volume on the theory of the novel and a book about the history of Hungarian literature. Given numerous chances to escape anti-Semitic persecution (as late as 1944), he chose to remain in Hungary, where his last novel, a Pirandellian fantasy about a king staging a coup against himself, then having to impersonate himself, Oliver VII, was published in 1942. It was passed off as a translation from the English, as no 'Jewish' work could be printed at the time.

During the 1940s, Szerb faced increasing hostility due to his Jewish background. In 1943, Szerb's History of World Literature was put on a list of forbidden works. During the period of Communist rule, it would also be censored, with the chapter on Soviet literature redacted, and the full version would only be available again in 1990. Szerb was deported to a concentration camp in Balf late in 1944. Admirers of his attempted to save him with falsified papers, but Szerb turned them down, wanting to share the fate of his generation. He was beaten to death there in January 1945, at the age of 43. He was survived by his wife, Klára Bálint, who died in 1992.

Work 
Szerb is best known for his academic works on literature. In the ten years before the Second World War, he wrote two monumental works of literary criticism, characterized by a brilliant and ironic style intended for an educated reader rather than an academic public.

In addition, Szerb wrote novellas and novels that still attract the attention of the reading public. The Pendragon Legend, Journey by Moonlight and The Queen's Necklace, for instance, fuse within the plot the aims of the literary critic with the aims of the novel writer. The author gives importance to the exotic in these novels, with a meta-literary outlook. In these three novels, the stage of the narrative action is always a Western European country: leaving quotidian Hungary allows the writer to transfigure the actions of his characters.

The Pendragon Legend
In his first novel, The Pendragon Legend, Szerb offers to his readers a representation of the United Kingdom and its inhabitants.  England and, in particular, London, hosted Szerb for a year and not only suggested to him new and interesting directions for his research, but also offered him the background for his first novel. The Pendragon Legend is a detective story that begins in the British Museum and finishes in a Welsh castle. The author provides a non-native's look at the country, in a way that is consistent with the parody genre.

In The Quest for the Miraculous: Survey and Problematic in the Modern Novel, Szerb claims that among the literary genres he prefers the fantasy novel. It fuses the quotidian details of everyday life with the fantastic feats that he calls “the miracle”. In the case of The Pendragon Legend, this allows the reader a cathartic experience through the adventures of the Hungarian philologist who serves as the protagonist of the novel.

Journey by Moonlight 
 (literally, "Traveler and Moonlight"), published in 1937, focuses on the development of the main character, Mihály - a bright and romantic, albeit conflicted, young man who sets off for a honeymoon in Italy with his new wife, Erzsi. Mihály quickly reveals his bizarre childhood experiences to her over a bottle of wine, alluding to a set of seemingly unresolved longings for eroticism and death which Erzsi seems to only vaguely comprehend. The plainspoken disharmony between the newlyweds leads to Mihály's detached self-recognition: he is not ready to be Erzsi's husband. He then leaves his wife for his own journey through the Italian countryside and eventually Rome - figuratively tracing the sparkling fanaticisms of his juvenile imagination, even rekindling bonds with changed (and some unchanged) childhood friends - all among the impressive foreign landscapes and peculiar liveliness of its inhabitants. Szerb celebrates the exotic cult of Italy, the leitmotif of thousands of writers from the past and present, relaying his own travel impressions of Italy though the mind of his eccentric protagonist, Mihály. Szerb explores the altogether interrelatedness of love and youthfulness within bourgeois society.

The Third Tower
Szerb also published an interesting diary, The Third Tower, recounting his travels to the cities in the north of Italy - Venice, Bologna, Ravenna.   Before going back home, he visited San Marino, Europe's oldest state, and Montale (San Marino) inspired the title of the book. The diary is divided into paragraphs which alternate descriptions with his personal thoughts.

Selected bibliography

 , 1927
 , 1936
 , 1927
 William Blake, 1928
 , 1929 ("An Outline of English Literature")
 , 1929
 , 1929
 , 1929
 Cynthia, 1932
 , 1934 ("History of Hungarian literature")
 , 1934
tr.: The Pendragon Legend, 2006
 , 1935 (short stories)
tr.: Love in a Bottle, 2010
 , 1935
tr.: A Martian's Guide to Budapest, 2015
 , 1936
tr.: The Third Tower: Journeys in Italy, 2014
 , 1936 ("The Quest for the Miraculous: Survey and Problematic in the Modern Novel") 
 , 1937
tr.: The Traveler translated by Peter Hargitai, Püski-Corvin Press NY, NY, USA. 1994. 
tr.: Journey by Moonlight, 2014
 Don't say... but say..., 1939
 , 1941 ("History of World Literature")
 , 1943 ("Oliver VII," published under the pseudonym A. H. Redcliff)
tr.: Oliver VII , 2007
 , 1943
tr.: The Queen's Necklace, 2009
 , 1943/1944 ("100 poems")

Translations

English
The Traveler (1994)  (earliest translation of )
Journey by Moonlight (2002) , 9781906548506
The Pendragon Legend (2006)  (another translation published 1963)
Oliver VII (2007) 
The Queen's Necklace (2009)  
Love in a Bottle (2010) 
Journey by Moonlight (2014) 
The Third Tower: Journeys in Italy (2014) 
A Martian's Guide to Budapest (2015) 
Traveler and the Moonlight (2016) 

Czech
  1946
  1985
  1998

Dutch
  2007 
  2005 Audiobook 
  2006 

Finnish
  2008 

French
  1990  
  1992 

German
  1966 
  1978 
  2004 
  1974
  2003 
  2005 
  (older translation of ) 1966 
  1972 (published in East Germany)
  2006 
  (translation of ) 2006 
  (translation of ) 1938

Hebrew
מסע לאור ירח 2008 

Italian
  1989
  1999

Polish
  1971
  1959

Slovak
  1972

Slovenian
  1980
  2011

Spanish
  1941
  2000
La leyenda de los Pendragon 2004
  2018 

Serbian
  2009 
  2010 

Swedish
  2010 

Turkish
  2008 
  2016

See also
Jacob Sager Weinstein

References

External links
United States Holocaust Memorial Museum
Hungarian book foundation database
review of "Journey by Moonlight'' at complete-review.com
Guardian Review of Journey by Moonlight
Guardian Review of The Pendragon Legend
Review of Journey by Moonlight
Essay by György Poszler in The Hungarian Quarterly autumn 2002

a photo of the author at lyrikwelt.de
REVIEW : The Third Tower by Antal Szerb

Academic staff of the University of Szeged
Hungarian male novelists
Jewish Hungarian writers
1901 births
1945 deaths
Hungarian civilians killed in World War II
Writers from Budapest
Burials at Kerepesi Cemetery
People executed by blunt trauma
Hungarian people executed in Nazi concentration camps
20th-century Hungarian novelists
Baumgarten Prize winners
20th-century Hungarian male writers
Deaths by beating in Europe